Italian moths represent about 4,959 different types of moths. The moths (mostly nocturnal) and butterflies (mostly diurnal) together make up the taxonomic order Lepidoptera.

This is a list of moth species (families beginning F-M)  which have been recorded in Italy, including San Marino, Sardinia, Sicily and Vatican City. Other parts of the list are at List of moths of Italy.

Gelechiidae
Acompsia cinerella (Clerck, 1759)
Acompsia delmastroella Huemer, 1998
Acompsia maculosella (Stainton, 1851)
Acompsia minorella Rebel, 1899
Acompsia tripunctella (Denis & Schiffermuller, 1775)
Acompsia schmidtiellus (Heyden, 1848)
Altenia scriptella (Hübner, 1796)
Anacampsis blattariella (Hübner, 1796)
Anacampsis hirsutella (Constant, 1885)
Anacampsis obscurella (Denis & Schiffermuller, 1775)
Anacampsis populella (Clerck, 1759)
Anacampsis scintillella (Fischer von Röslerstamm, 1841)
Anacampsis temerella (Lienig & Zeller, 1846)
Anacampsis timidella (Wocke, 1887)
Anacampsis trifoliella (Constant, 1890)
Anarsia lineatella Zeller, 1839
Anarsia spartiella (Schrank, 1802)
Anasphaltis renigerellus (Zeller, 1839)
Apatetris mediterranella Nel & Varenne, 2012
Apodia bifractella (Duponchel, 1843)
Aproaerema anthyllidella (Hübner, 1813)
Argolamprotes micella (Denis & Schiffermuller, 1775)
Aristotelia brizella (Treitschke, 1833)
Aristotelia decoratella (Staudinger, 1879)
Aristotelia decurtella (Hübner, 1813)
Aristotelia ericinella (Zeller, 1839)
Aristotelia heliacella (Herrich-Schäffer, 1854)
Aristotelia staticella Milliere, 1876
Aristotelia subdecurtella (Stainton, 1859)
Aristotelia subericinella (Duponchel, 1843)
Aroga aristotelis (Milliere, 1876)
Aroga flavicomella (Zeller, 1839)
Aroga pascuicola (Staudinger, 1871)
Aroga velocella (Duponchel, 1838)
Athrips amoenella (Frey, 1882)
Athrips mouffetella (Linnaeus, 1758)
Athrips nigricostella (Duponchel, 1842)
Athrips rancidella (Herrich-Schäffer, 1854)
Atremaea lonchoptera Staudinger, 1871
Brachmia blandella (Fabricius, 1798)
Brachmia dimidiella (Denis & Schiffermuller, 1775)
Brachmia procursella Rebel, 1903
Bryotropha affinis (Haworth, 1828)
Bryotropha arabica Amsel, 1952
Bryotropha desertella (Douglas, 1850)
Bryotropha domestica (Haworth, 1828)
Bryotropha dryadella (Zeller, 1850)
Bryotropha figulella (Staudinger, 1859)
Bryotropha galbanella (Zeller, 1839)
Bryotropha gallurella Amsel, 1952
Bryotropha hendrikseni Karsholt & Rutten, 2005
Bryotropha italica Karsholt & Rutten, 2005
Bryotropha pallorella Amsel, 1952
Bryotropha plebejella (Zeller, 1847)
Bryotropha sattleri Nel, 2003
Bryotropha senectella (Zeller, 1839)
Bryotropha similis (Stainton, 1854)
Bryotropha sutteri Karsholt & Rutten, 2005
Bryotropha terrella (Denis & Schiffermuller, 1775)
Carpatolechia aenigma (Sattler, 1983)
Carpatolechia alburnella (Zeller, 1839)
Carpatolechia decorella (Haworth, 1812)
Carpatolechia fugacella (Zeller, 1839)
Carpatolechia fugitivella (Zeller, 1839)
Carpatolechia notatella (Hübner, 1813)
Carpatolechia proximella (Hübner, 1796)
Caryocolum alsinella (Zeller, 1868)
Caryocolum amaurella (M. Hering, 1924)
Caryocolum blandelloides Karsholt, 1981
Caryocolum blandulella (Tutt, 1887)
Caryocolum bosalella (Rebel, 1936)
Caryocolum cauligenella (Schmid, 1863)
Caryocolum crypticum Huemer, Karsholt & Mutanen, 2014
Caryocolum delphinatella (Constant, 1890)
Caryocolum fibigerium Huemer, 1988
Caryocolum gallagenellum Huemer, 1989
Caryocolum huebneri (Haworth, 1828)
Caryocolum interalbicella (Herrich-Schäffer, 1854)
Caryocolum junctella (Douglas, 1851)
Caryocolum klosi (Rebel, 1917)
Caryocolum laceratella (Zeller, 1868)
Caryocolum leucomelanella (Zeller, 1839)
Caryocolum leucothoracellum (Klimesch, 1953)
Caryocolum marmorea (Haworth, 1828)
Caryocolum moehringiae (Klimesch, 1954)
Caryocolum mucronatella (Chretien, 1900)
Caryocolum peregrinella (Herrich-Schäffer, 1854)
Caryocolum petrophila (Preissecker, 1914)
Caryocolum petryi (O. Hofmann, 1899)
Caryocolum proxima (Haworth, 1828)
Caryocolum pullatella (Tengstrom, 1848)
Caryocolum repentis Huemer & Luquet, 1992
Caryocolum saginella (Zeller, 1868)
Caryocolum schleichi (Christoph, 1872)
Caryocolum siculum Bella, 2008
Caryocolum stramentella (Rebel, 1935)
Caryocolum tischeriella (Zeller, 1839)
Caryocolum trauniella (Zeller, 1868)
Caryocolum vicinella (Douglas, 1851)
Caryocolum viscariella (Stainton, 1855)
Caulastrocecis furfurella (Staudinger, 1871)
Chionodes continuella (Zeller, 1839)
Chionodes distinctella (Zeller, 1839)
Chionodes electella (Zeller, 1839)
Chionodes fumatella (Douglas, 1850)
Chionodes hayreddini Kocak, 1986
Chionodes holosericella (Herrich-Schäffer, 1854)
Chionodes luctuella (Hübner, 1793)
Chionodes lugubrella (Fabricius, 1794)
Chionodes nebulosella (Heinemann, 1870)
Chionodes perpetuella (Herrich-Schäffer, 1854)
Chionodes praeclarella (Herrich-Schäffer, 1854)
Chionodes tragicella (Heyden, 1865)
Chionodes viduella (Fabricius, 1794)
Chrysoesthia aletris (Walsingham, 1919)
Chrysoesthia atriplicella (Amsel, 1939)
Chrysoesthia drurella (Fabricius, 1775)
Chrysoesthia sexguttella (Thunberg, 1794)
Coleotechnites piceaella (Kearfott, 1903)
Cosmardia moritzella (Treitschke, 1835)
Crossobela trinotella (Herrich-Schäffer, 1856)
Deltophora stictella (Rebel, 1927)
Dichomeris acuminatus (Staudinger, 1876)
Dichomeris alacella (Zeller, 1839)
Dichomeris barbella (Denis & Schiffermuller, 1775)
Dichomeris derasella (Denis & Schiffermuller, 1775)
Dichomeris helianthemi (Walsingham, 1903)
Dichomeris juniperella (Linnaeus, 1761)
Dichomeris lamprostoma (Zeller, 1847)
Dichomeris latipennella (Rebel, 1937)
Dichomeris limbipunctellus (Staudinger, 1859)
Dichomeris limosellus (Schlager, 1849)
Dichomeris marginella (Fabricius, 1781)
Dichomeris nitiellus (Costantini, 1923)
Dichomeris rasilella (Herrich-Schäffer, 1854)
Dichomeris ustalella (Fabricius, 1794)
Ephysteris diminutella (Zeller, 1847)
Ephysteris iberica Povolny, 1977
Ephysteris insulella (Heinemann, 1870)
Ephysteris inustella (Zeller, 1847)
Ephysteris promptella (Staudinger, 1859)
Epidola barcinonella Milliere, 1867
Epidola nuraghella Hartig, 1939
Eulamprotes atrella (Denis & Schiffermuller, 1775)
Eulamprotes baldizzonei Huemer & Karsholt, 2013
Eulamprotes helotella (Staudinger, 1859)
Eulamprotes libertinella (Zeller, 1872)
Eulamprotes nigritella (Zeller, 1847)
Eulamprotes nigromaculella (Milliere, 1872)
Eulamprotes occidentella Huemer & Karsholt, 2011
Eulamprotes ochricapilla (Rebel, 1903)
Eulamprotes superbella (Zeller, 1839)
Eulamprotes unicolorella (Duponchel, 1843)
Eulamprotes wilkella (Linnaeus, 1758)
Exoteleia dodecella (Linnaeus, 1758)
Exoteleia succinctella (Zeller, 1872)
Filatima spurcella (Duponchel, 1843)
Filatima tephritidella (Duponchel, 1844)
Gelechia asinella (Hübner, 1796)
Gelechia basipunctella Herrich-Schäffer, 1854
Gelechia dujardini Huemer, 1991
Gelechia hippophaella (Schrank, 1802)
Gelechia mediterranea Huemer, 1991
Gelechia muscosella Zeller, 1839
Gelechia nigra (Haworth, 1828)
Gelechia rhombella (Denis & Schiffermuller, 1775)
Gelechia sabinellus (Zeller, 1839)
Gelechia scotinella Herrich-Schäffer, 1854
Gelechia senticetella (Staudinger, 1859)
Gelechia sestertiella Herrich-Schäffer, 1854
Gelechia sororculella (Hübner, 1817)
Gelechia turpella (Denis & Schiffermuller, 1775)
Gladiovalva rumicivorella (Milliere, 1881)
Gnorimoschema epithymella (Staudinger, 1859)
Gnorimoschema hoefneri (Rebel, 1909)
Gnorimoschema nilsi Huemer, 1996
Gnorimoschema soffneri Riedl, 1965
Gnorimoschema steueri Povolny, 1975
Gnorimoschema streliciella (Herrich-Schäffer, 1854)
Gnorimoschema valesiella (Staudinger, 1877)
Helcystogramma arulensis (Rebel, 1929)
Helcystogramma klimeschi Ponomarenko & Huemer, 2001
Helcystogramma lutatella (Herrich-Schäffer, 1854)
Helcystogramma rufescens (Haworth, 1828)
Helcystogramma triannulella (Herrich-Schäffer, 1854)
Hypatima rhomboidella (Linnaeus, 1758)
Isophrictis anthemidella (Wocke, 1871)
Isophrictis corsicella Amsel, 1936
Isophrictis invisella (Constant, 1885)
Isophrictis kefersteiniellus (Zeller, 1850)
Isophrictis lineatellus (Zeller, 1850)
Isophrictis meridionella (Herrich-Schäffer, 1854)
Isophrictis striatella (Denis & Schiffermuller, 1775)
Istrianis brucinella (Mann, 1872)
Istrianis femoralis (Staudinger, 1876)
Istrianis myricariella (Frey, 1870)
Iwaruna biguttella (Duponchel, 1843)
Iwaruna klimeschi Wolff, 1958
Keiferia lycopersicella (Walsingham, 1897)
Klimeschiopsis discontinuella (Rebel, 1899)
Klimeschiopsis kiningerella (Duponchel, 1843)
Megacraspedus bilineatella Huemer & Karsholt, 1996
Megacraspedus binotella (Duponchel, 1843)
Megacraspedus dolosellus (Zeller, 1839)
Megacraspedus eburnellus Huemer & Karsholt, 2001
Megacraspedus imparellus (Fischer von Röslerstamm, 1843)
Megacraspedus lanceolellus (Zeller, 1850)
Megacraspedus separatellus (Fischer von Röslerstamm, 1843)
Megacraspedus tristictus Walsingham, 1910
Mesophleps corsicella Herrich-Schäffer, 1856
Mesophleps oxycedrella (Milliere, 1871)
Mesophleps silacella (Hübner, 1796)
Metanarsia modesta Staudinger, 1871
Metzneria aestivella (Zeller, 1839)
Metzneria agraphella (Ragonot, 1895)
Metzneria aprilella (Herrich-Schäffer, 1854)
Metzneria artificella (Herrich-Schäffer, 1861)
Metzneria campicolella (Mann, 1857)
Metzneria diffusella Englert, 1974
Metzneria intestinella (Mann, 1864)
Metzneria lappella (Linnaeus, 1758)
Metzneria littorella (Douglas, 1850)
Metzneria metzneriella (Stainton, 1851)
Metzneria neuropterella (Zeller, 1839)
Metzneria paucipunctella (Zeller, 1839)
Metzneria santolinella (Amsel, 1936)
Metzneria subflavella Englert, 1974
Metzneria torosulella (Rebel, 1893)
Microlechia chretieni Turati, 1924
Mirificarma burdonella (Rebel, 1930)
Mirificarma cytisella (Treitschke, 1833)
Mirificarma eburnella (Denis & Schiffermuller, 1775)
Mirificarma flavella (Duponchel, 1844)
Mirificarma interrupta (Curtis, 1827)
Mirificarma lentiginosella (Zeller, 1839)
Mirificarma maculatella (Hübner, 1796)
Mirificarma monticolella (Rebel, 1931)
Mirificarma mulinella (Zeller, 1839)
Mirificarma ulicinella (Staudinger, 1859)
Monochroa bronzella Karsholt, Nel, Fournier, Varenne & Huemer, 2013
Monochroa conspersella (Herrich-Schäffer, 1854)
Monochroa cytisella (Curtis, 1837)
Monochroa dellabeffai (Rebel, 1932)
Monochroa elongella (Heinemann, 1870)
Monochroa ferrea (Frey, 1870)
Monochroa hornigi (Staudinger, 1883)
Monochroa lucidella (Stephens, 1834)
Monochroa lutulentella (Zeller, 1839)
Monochroa melagonella (Constant, 1895)
Monochroa nomadella (Zeller, 1868)
Monochroa parvulata (Gozmany, 1957)
Monochroa scutatella (Muller-Rutz, 1920)
Monochroa sepicolella (Herrich-Schäffer, 1854)
Monochroa servella (Zeller, 1839)
Monochroa simplicella (Lienig & Zeller, 1846)
Monochroa sperata Huemer & Karsholt, 2010
Monochroa tenebrella (Hübner, 1817)
Neofaculta ericetella (Geyer, 1832)
Neofaculta infernella (Herrich-Schäffer, 1854)
Neofriseria peliella (Treitschke, 1835)
Neofriseria singula (Staudinger, 1876)
Neotelphusa cisti (Stainton, 1869)
Neotelphusa huemeri Nel, 1998
Neotelphusa sequax (Haworth, 1828)
Nothris congressariella (Bruand, 1858)
Nothris lemniscellus (Zeller, 1839)
Nothris verbascella (Denis & Schiffermuller, 1775)
Ochrodia subdiminutella (Stainton, 1867)
Oecocecis guyonella Guenee, 1870
Ornativalva heluanensis (Debski, 1913)
Ornativalva plutelliformis (Staudinger, 1859)
Ornativalva pseudotamaricella Sattler, 1967
Ornativalva tamaricella (Zeller, 1850)
Palumbina guerinii (Stainton, 1858)
Parachronistis albiceps (Zeller, 1839)
Paranarsia joannisiella Ragonot, 1895
Parastenolechia nigrinotella (Zeller, 1847)
Pectinophora gossypiella (Saunders, 1844)
Pexicopia malvella (Hübner, 1805)
Phthorimaea operculella (Zeller, 1873)
Platyedra subcinerea (Haworth, 1828)
Pogochaetia solitaria Staudinger, 1879
Prolita sexpunctella (Fabricius, 1794)
Prolita solutella (Zeller, 1839)
Psamathocrita osseella (Stainton, 1860)
Pseudosophronia exustellus (Zeller, 1847)
Pseudotelphusa istrella (Mann, 1866)
Pseudotelphusa paripunctella (Thunberg, 1794)
Pseudotelphusa scalella (Scopoli, 1763)
Pseudotelphusa tessella (Linnaeus, 1758)
Psoricoptera gibbosella (Zeller, 1839)
Psoricoptera speciosella Teich, 1893
Ptocheuusa abnormella (Herrich-Schäffer, 1854)
Ptocheuusa minimella (Rebel, 1936)
Ptocheuusa paupella (Zeller, 1847)
Pyncostola bohemiella (Nickerl, 1864)
Recurvaria costimaculella Huemer & Karsholt, 2001
Recurvaria leucatella (Clerck, 1759)
Recurvaria nanella (Denis & Schiffermuller, 1775)
Sattleria izoardi Huemer & Sattler, 1992
Sattleria melaleucella (Constant, 1865)
Sattleria triglavica Povolny, 1987
Scrobipalpa acuminatella (Sircom, 1850)
Scrobipalpa arenbergeri Povolny, 1973
Scrobipalpa artemisiella (Treitschke, 1833)
Scrobipalpa atriplicella (Fischer von Röslerstamm, 1841)
Scrobipalpa bigoti Povolny, 1973
Scrobipalpa bradleyi Povolny, 1971
Scrobipalpa chrysanthemella (E. Hofmann, 1867)
Scrobipalpa ergasima (Meyrick, 1916)
Scrobipalpa feralella (Zeller, 1872)
Scrobipalpa gallicella (Constant, 1885)
Scrobipalpa halonella (Herrich-Schäffer, 1854)
Scrobipalpa halymella (Milliere, 1864)
Scrobipalpa instabilella (Douglas, 1846)
Scrobipalpa monochromella (Constant, 1895)
Scrobipalpa montanella (Chretien, 1910)
Scrobipalpa murinella (Duponchel, 1843)
Scrobipalpa obsoletella (Fischer von Röslerstamm, 1841)
Scrobipalpa ocellatella (Boyd, 1858)
Scrobipalpa pauperella (Heinemann, 1870)
Scrobipalpa perinii (Klimesch, 1951)
Scrobipalpa peterseni (Povolny, 1965)
Scrobipalpa phagnalella (Constant, 1895)
Scrobipalpa portosanctana (Stainton, 1859)
Scrobipalpa proclivella (Fuchs, 1886)
Scrobipalpa rebeli (Preissecker, 1914)
Scrobipalpa salinella (Zeller, 1847)
Scrobipalpa samadensis (Pfaffenzeller, 1870)
Scrobipalpa spergulariella (Chretien, 1910)
Scrobipalpa suaedella (Richardson, 1893)
Scrobipalpa suaedicola (Mabille, 1906)
Scrobipalpa suasella (Constant, 1895)
Scrobipalpa superstes Povolny, 1977
Scrobipalpa thymelaeae (Amsel, 1939)
Scrobipalpa vasconiella (Rossler, 1877)
Scrobipalpa voltinella (Chretien, 1898)
Scrobipalpopsis petasitis (Pfaffenzeller, 1867)
Scrobipalpula diffluella (Frey, 1870)
Scrobipalpula psilella (Herrich-Schäffer, 1854)
Scrobipalpula tussilaginis (Stainton, 1867)
Sitotroga cerealella (Olivier, 1789)
Sitotroga psacasta Meyrick, 1908
Sophronia chilonella (Treitschke, 1833)
Sophronia curonella Standfuss, 1884
Sophronia grandii M. Hering, 1933
Sophronia humerella (Denis & Schiffermuller, 1775)
Sophronia illustrella (Hübner, 1796)
Sophronia semicostella (Hübner, 1813)
Sophronia sicariellus (Zeller, 1839)
Stenolechia gemmella (Linnaeus, 1758)
Stenolechiodes pseudogemmellus Elsner, 1996
Stomopteryx basalis (Staudinger, 1876)
Stomopteryx detersella (Zeller, 1847)
Stomopteryx flavipalpella Jackh, 1959
Stomopteryx hungaricella Gozmany, 1957
Stomopteryx remissella (Zeller, 1847)
Syncopacma albifrontella (Heinemann, 1870)
Syncopacma albipalpella (Herrich-Schäffer, 1854)
Syncopacma cinctella (Clerck, 1759)
Syncopacma cincticulella (Bruand, 1851)
Syncopacma coronillella (Treitschke, 1833)
Syncopacma montanata Gozmany, 1957
Syncopacma patruella (Mann, 1857)
Syncopacma polychromella (Rebel, 1902)
Syncopacma sangiella (Stainton, 1863)
Syncopacma suecicella (Wolff, 1958)
Syncopacma taeniolella (Zeller, 1839)
Syncopacma vinella (Bankes, 1898)
Syncopacma wormiella (Wolff, 1958)
Teleiodes brevivalva Huemer, 1992
Teleiodes flavimaculella (Herrich-Schäffer, 1854)
Teleiodes italica Huemer, 1992
Teleiodes luculella (Hübner, 1813)
Teleiodes saltuum (Zeller, 1878)
Teleiodes wagae (Nowicki, 1860)
Teleiopsis albifemorella (E. Hofmann, 1867)
Teleiopsis bagriotella (Duponchel, 1840)
Teleiopsis diffinis (Haworth, 1828)
Teleiopsis rosalbella (Fologne, 1862)
Teleiopsis terebinthinella (Herrich-Schäffer, 1856)
Telphusa cistiflorella (Constant, 1890)
Thiotricha majorella (Rebel, 1910)
Thiotricha subocellea (Stephens, 1834)
Tuta absoluta (Meyrick, 1917)
Xenolechia aethiops (Humphreys & Westwood, 1845)
Xystophora carchariella (Zeller, 1839)
Xystophora pulveratella (Herrich-Schäffer, 1854)

Geometridae
Abraxas grossulariata (Linnaeus, 1758)
Abraxas pantaria (Linnaeus, 1767)
Abraxas sylvata (Scopoli, 1763)
Acasis viretata (Hübner, 1799)
Adactylotis contaminaria (Hübner, 1813)
Aethalura punctulata (Denis & Schiffermuller, 1775)
Agriopis aurantiaria (Hübner, 1799)
Agriopis bajaria (Denis & Schiffermuller, 1775)
Agriopis leucophaearia (Denis & Schiffermuller, 1775)
Agriopis marginaria (Fabricius, 1776)
Alcis bastelbergeri (Hirschke, 1908)
Alcis jubata (Thunberg, 1788)
Alcis repandata (Linnaeus, 1758)
Alsophila aceraria (Denis & Schiffermuller, 1775)
Alsophila aescularia (Denis & Schiffermuller, 1775)
Angerona prunaria (Linnaeus, 1758)
Anticlea derivata (Denis & Schiffermuller, 1775)
Anticollix sparsata (Treitschke, 1828)
Apeira syringaria (Linnaeus, 1758)
Aplasta ononaria (Fuessly, 1783)
Aplocera corsalta (Schawerda, 1928)
Aplocera efformata (Guenee, 1858)
Aplocera plagiata (Linnaeus, 1758)
Aplocera praeformata (Hübner, 1826)
Aplocera simpliciata (Treitschke, 1835)
Apocheima hispidaria (Denis & Schiffermuller, 1775)
Apochima flabellaria (Heeger, 1838)
Archiearis parthenias (Linnaeus, 1761)
Artiora evonymaria (Denis & Schiffermuller, 1775)
Ascotis selenaria (Denis & Schiffermuller, 1775)
Aspitates gilvaria (Denis & Schiffermuller, 1775)
Aspitates ochrearia (Rossi, 1794)
Asthena albulata (Hufnagel, 1767)
Asthena anseraria (Herrich-Schäffer, 1855)
Athroolopha chrysitaria (Geyer, 1831)
Athroolopha pennigeraria (Hübner, 1813)
Baptria tibiale (Esper, 1791)
Biston betularia (Linnaeus, 1758)
Biston strataria (Hufnagel, 1767)
Boudinotiana notha (Hübner, 1803)
Bupalus piniaria (Linnaeus, 1758)
Cabera exanthemata (Scopoli, 1763)
Cabera pusaria (Linnaeus, 1758)
Calamodes occitanaria (Duponchel, 1829)
Calamodes subscudularia (Turati, 1919)
Campaea honoraria (Denis & Schiffermuller, 1775)
Campaea margaritaria (Linnaeus, 1761)
Camptogramma bilineata (Linnaeus, 1758)
Camptogramma bistrigata (Treitschke, 1828)
Camptogramma scripturata (Hübner, 1799)
Carsia lythoxylata (Hübner, 1799)
Carsia sororiata (Hübner, 1813)
Casilda antophilaria (Hübner, 1813)
Casilda consecraria (Staudinger, 1871)
Cataclysme dissimilata (Rambur, 1833)
Cataclysme riguata (Hübner, 1813)
Catarhoe basochesiata (Duponchel, 1831)
Catarhoe cuculata (Hufnagel, 1767)
Catarhoe permixtaria (Herrich-Schäffer, 1856)
Catarhoe putridaria (Herrich-Schäffer, 1852)
Catarhoe rubidata (Denis & Schiffermuller, 1775)
Celonoptera mirificaria Lederer, 1862
Cepphis advenaria (Hübner, 1790)
Chariaspilates formosaria (Eversmann, 1837)
Charissa bellieri (Oberthur, 1913)
Charissa obscurata (Denis & Schiffermuller, 1775)
Charissa italohelveticus (Rezbanyai-Reser, 1986)
Charissa pullata (Denis & Schiffermuller, 1775)
Charissa corsica (Oberthur, 1913)
Charissa mucidaria (Hübner, 1799)
Charissa variegata (Duponchel, 1830)
Charissa ambiguata (Duponchel, 1830)
Charissa onustaria (Herrich-Schäffer, 1852)
Charissa predotae (Schawerda, 1929)
Charissa supinaria (Mann, 1854)
Charissa glaucinaria (Hübner, 1799)
Chemerina caliginearia (Rambur, 1833)
Chesias angeri Schawerda, 1919
Chesias capriata Prout, 1904
Chesias legatella (Denis & Schiffermuller, 1775)
Chesias linogrisearia Constant, 1888
Chesias rufata (Fabricius, 1775)
Chiasmia aestimaria (Hübner, 1809)
Chiasmia clathrata (Linnaeus, 1758)
Chlorissa cloraria (Hübner, 1813)
Chlorissa viridata (Linnaeus, 1758)
Chloroclysta miata (Linnaeus, 1758)
Chloroclysta siterata (Hufnagel, 1767)
Chloroclystis v-ata (Haworth, 1809)
Cidaria fulvata (Forster, 1771)
Cleora cinctaria (Denis & Schiffermuller, 1775)
Cleorodes lichenaria (Hufnagel, 1767)
Cleta filacearia (Herrich-Schäffer, 1847)
Coenocalpe lapidata (Hübner, 1809)
Coenotephria ablutaria (Boisduval, 1840)
Coenotephria salicata (Denis & Schiffermuller, 1775)
Coenotephria tophaceata (Denis & Schiffermuller, 1775)
Colostygia aptata (Hübner, 1813)
Colostygia aqueata (Hübner, 1813)
Colostygia austriacaria (Herrich-Schäffer, 1852)
Colostygia kitschelti (Rebel, 1934)
Colostygia kollariaria (Herrich-Schäffer, 1848)
Colostygia laetaria (de La Harpe, 1853)
Colostygia multistrigaria (Haworth, 1809)
Colostygia olivata (Denis & Schiffermuller, 1775)
Colostygia pectinataria (Knoch, 1781)
Colostygia sericeata (Schwingenschuss, 1926)
Colostygia tempestaria (Herrich-Schäffer, 1852)
Colostygia turbata (Hübner, 1799)
Colotois pennaria (Linnaeus, 1761)
Comibaena bajularia (Denis & Schiffermuller, 1775)
Compsoptera argentaria (Herrich-Schäffer, 1839)
Compsoptera jourdanaria (Serres, 1826)
Compsoptera opacaria (Hübner, 1819)
Cosmorhoe ocellata (Linnaeus, 1758)
Costaconvexa polygrammata (Borkhausen, 1794)
Crocallis auberti Oberthur, 1883
Crocallis boisduvaliaria (H. Lucas, 1849)
Crocallis dardoinaria Donzel, 1840
Crocallis elinguaria (Linnaeus, 1758)
Crocallis tusciaria (Borkhausen, 1793)
Crocota pseudotinctaria Leraut, 1999
Crocota tinctaria (Hübner, 1799)
Cyclophora linearia (Hübner, 1799)
Cyclophora porata (Linnaeus, 1767)
Cyclophora punctaria (Linnaeus, 1758)
Cyclophora suppunctaria (Zeller, 1847)
Cyclophora albiocellaria (Hübner, 1789)
Cyclophora albipunctata (Hufnagel, 1767)
Cyclophora annularia (Fabricius, 1775)
Cyclophora pendularia (Clerck, 1759)
Cyclophora puppillaria (Hübner, 1799)
Cyclophora quercimontaria (Bastelberger, 1897)
Cyclophora ruficiliaria (Herrich-Schäffer, 1855)
Deileptenia ribeata (Clerck, 1759)
Digrammia rippertaria (Duponchel, 1830)
Dyscia conspersaria (Denis & Schiffermuller, 1775)
Dyscia innocentaria (Christoph, 1885)
Dyscia raunaria (Freyer, 1852)
Dyscia lentiscaria (Donzel, 1837)
Dysstroma citrata (Linnaeus, 1761)
Dysstroma truncata (Hufnagel, 1767)
Earophila badiata (Denis & Schiffermuller, 1775)
Ecliptopera capitata (Herrich-Schäffer, 1839)
Ecliptopera silaceata (Denis & Schiffermuller, 1775)
Ectropis crepuscularia (Denis & Schiffermuller, 1775)
Ekboarmia atlanticaria (Staudinger, 1859)
Electrophaes corylata (Thunberg, 1792)
Elophos andereggaria (de La Harpe, 1853)
Elophos caelibaria (Heydenreich, 1851)
Elophos operaria (Hübner, 1813)
Elophos zelleraria (Freyer, 1836)
Elophos dilucidaria (Denis & Schiffermuller, 1775)
Elophos dognini (Thierry-Mieg, 1910)
Elophos serotinaria (Denis & Schiffermuller, 1775)
Elophos vittaria (Thunberg, 1788)
Ematurga atomaria (Linnaeus, 1758)
Emmiltis pygmaearia (Hübner, 1809)
Ennomos alniaria (Linnaeus, 1758)
Ennomos autumnaria (Werneburg, 1859)
Ennomos erosaria (Denis & Schiffermuller, 1775)
Ennomos fuscantaria (Haworth, 1809)
Ennomos quercaria (Hübner, 1813)
Ennomos quercinaria (Hufnagel, 1767)
Entephria caesiata (Denis & Schiffermuller, 1775)
Entephria cyanata (Hübner, 1809)
Entephria flavata (Osthelder, 1929)
Entephria flavicinctata (Hübner, 1813)
Entephria infidaria (de La Harpe, 1853)
Entephria nobiliaria (Herrich-Schäffer, 1852)
Epilobophora sabinata (Geyer, 1831)
Epione repandaria (Hufnagel, 1767)
Epione vespertaria (Linnaeus, 1767)
Epirrhoe alternata (Muller, 1764)
Epirrhoe galiata (Denis & Schiffermuller, 1775)
Epirrhoe hastulata (Hübner, 1790)
Epirrhoe molluginata (Hübner, 1813)
Epirrhoe rivata (Hübner, 1813)
Epirrhoe timozzaria (Constant, 1884)
Epirrhoe tristata (Linnaeus, 1758)
Epirrita autumnata (Borkhausen, 1794)
Epirrita christyi (Allen, 1906)
Epirrita dilutata (Denis & Schiffermuller, 1775)
Erannis ankeraria (Staudinger, 1861)
Erannis defoliaria (Clerck, 1759)
Euchoeca nebulata (Scopoli, 1763)
Eucrostes indigenata (de Villers, 1789)
Eulithis mellinata (Fabricius, 1787)
Eulithis populata (Linnaeus, 1758)
Eulithis prunata (Linnaeus, 1758)
Eulithis testata (Linnaeus, 1761)
Euphyia adumbraria (Herrich-Schäffer, 1852)
Euphyia biangulata (Haworth, 1809)
Euphyia frustata (Treitschke, 1828)
Euphyia mesembrina (Rebel, 1927)
Euphyia unangulata (Haworth, 1809)
Eupithecia abbreviata Stephens, 1831
Eupithecia abietaria (Goeze, 1781)
Eupithecia absinthiata (Clerck, 1759)
Eupithecia actaeata Walderdorff, 1869
Eupithecia addictata Dietze, 1908
Eupithecia alliaria Staudinger, 1870
Eupithecia analoga Djakonov, 1926
Eupithecia assimilata Doubleday, 1856
Eupithecia breviculata (Donzel, 1837)
Eupithecia carpophagata Staudinger, 1871
Eupithecia cauchiata (Duponchel, 1831)
Eupithecia centaureata (Denis & Schiffermuller, 1775)
Eupithecia cocciferata Milliere, 1864
Eupithecia cretaceata (Packard, 1874)
Eupithecia cuculliaria (Rebel, 1901)
Eupithecia denotata (Hübner, 1813)
Eupithecia denticulata (Treitschke, 1828)
Eupithecia dissertata (Pungeler, 1905)
Eupithecia distinctaria Herrich-Schäffer, 1848
Eupithecia dodoneata Guenee, 1858
Eupithecia druentiata Dietze, 1902
Eupithecia egenaria Herrich-Schäffer, 1848
Eupithecia ericeata (Rambur, 1833)
Eupithecia exiguata (Hübner, 1813)
Eupithecia expallidata Doubleday, 1856
Eupithecia extraversaria Herrich-Schäffer, 1852
Eupithecia extremata (Fabricius, 1787)
Eupithecia gemellata Herrich-Schäffer, 1861
Eupithecia graphata (Treitschke, 1828)
Eupithecia gratiosata Herrich-Schäffer, 1861
Eupithecia gueneata Milliere, 1862
Eupithecia haworthiata Doubleday, 1856
Eupithecia icterata (de Villers, 1789)
Eupithecia immundata (Lienig, 1846)
Eupithecia impurata (Hübner, 1813)
Eupithecia indigata (Hübner, 1813)
Eupithecia innotata (Hufnagel, 1767)
Eupithecia insigniata (Hübner, 1790)
Eupithecia intricata (Zetterstedt, 1839)
Eupithecia inturbata (Hübner, 1817)
Eupithecia irriguata (Hübner, 1813)
Eupithecia lanceata (Hübner, 1825)
Eupithecia laquaearia Herrich-Schäffer, 1848
Eupithecia lariciata (Freyer, 1841)
Eupithecia lentiscata Mabille, 1869
Eupithecia liguriata Milliere, 1884
Eupithecia limbata Staudinger, 1879
Eupithecia linariata (Denis & Schiffermuller, 1775)
Eupithecia massiliata Milliere, 1865
Eupithecia millefoliata Rossler, 1866
Eupithecia nanata (Hübner, 1813)
Eupithecia ochridata Schutze & Pinker, 1968
Eupithecia orphnata W. Petersen, 1909
Eupithecia oxycedrata (Rambur, 1833)
Eupithecia pantellata Milliere, 1875
Eupithecia pauxillaria Boisduval, 1840
Eupithecia pernotata Guenee, 1858
Eupithecia phoeniceata (Rambur, 1834)
Eupithecia pimpinellata (Hübner, 1813)
Eupithecia plumbeolata (Haworth, 1809)
Eupithecia poecilata Pungeler, 1888
Eupithecia pulchellata Stephens, 1831
Eupithecia pusillata (Denis & Schiffermuller, 1775)
Eupithecia pygmaeata (Hübner, 1799)
Eupithecia pyreneata Mabille, 1871
Eupithecia riparia Herrich-Schäffer, 1851
Eupithecia santolinata Mabille, 1871
Eupithecia sardoa Dietze, 1910
Eupithecia satyrata (Hübner, 1813)
Eupithecia schiefereri Bohatsch, 1893
Eupithecia scopariata (Rambur, 1833)
Eupithecia selinata Herrich-Schäffer, 1861
Eupithecia semigraphata Bruand, 1850
Eupithecia silenata Assmann, 1848
Eupithecia silenicolata Mabille, 1867
Eupithecia simpliciata (Haworth, 1809)
Eupithecia sinuosaria (Eversmann, 1848)
Eupithecia spadiceata Zerny, 1933
Eupithecia spissilineata (Metzner, 1846)
Eupithecia subfuscata (Haworth, 1809)
Eupithecia subumbrata (Denis & Schiffermuller, 1775)
Eupithecia succenturiata (Linnaeus, 1758)
Eupithecia tantillaria Boisduval, 1840
Eupithecia tenuiata (Hübner, 1813)
Eupithecia thalictrata (Pungeler, 1902)
Eupithecia tripunctaria Herrich-Schäffer, 1852
Eupithecia trisignaria Herrich-Schäffer, 1848
Eupithecia ultimaria Boisduval, 1840
Eupithecia undata (Freyer, 1840)
Eupithecia unedonata Mabille, 1868
Eupithecia valerianata (Hübner, 1813)
Eupithecia variostrigata Alphéraky, 1876
Eupithecia venosata (Fabricius, 1787)
Eupithecia veratraria Herrich-Schäffer, 1848
Eupithecia virgaureata Doubleday, 1861
Eupithecia vulgata (Haworth, 1809)
Eurranthis plummistaria (de Villers, 1789)
Eustroma reticulata (Denis & Schiffermuller, 1775)
Fagivorina arenaria (Hufnagel, 1767)
Gagitodes sagittata (Fabricius, 1787)
Gandaritis pyraliata (Denis & Schiffermuller, 1775)
Geometra papilionaria (Linnaeus, 1758)
Glacies alpinata (Scopoli, 1763)
Glacies alticolaria (Mann, 1853)
Glacies baldensis (Wolfsberger, 1966)
Glacies bentelii (Ratzer, 1890)
Glacies canaliculata (Hochenwarth, 1785)
Glacies coracina (Esper, 1805)
Glacies noricana (Wagner, 1898)
Glacies perlinii (Turati, 1915)
Gnopharmia stevenaria (Boisduval, 1840)
Gnophos sartata Treitschke, 1827
Gnophos furvata (Denis & Schiffermuller, 1775)
Gnophos obfuscata (Denis & Schiffermuller, 1775)
Gnophos dumetata Treitschke, 1827
Gymnoscelis rufifasciata (Haworth, 1809)
Heliomata glarearia (Denis & Schiffermuller, 1775)
Hemistola chrysoprasaria (Esper, 1795)
Hemistola siciliana Prout, 1935
Hemithea aestivaria (Hübner, 1789)
Holoterpna pruinosata (Staudinger, 1897)
Horisme aemulata (Hübner, 1813)
Horisme aquata (Hübner, 1813)
Horisme calligraphata (Herrich-Schäffer, 1838)
Horisme corticata (Treitschke, 1835)
Horisme exoletata (Herrich-Schäffer, 1838)
Horisme predotai Bytinski-Salz, 1937
Horisme radicaria (de La Harpe, 1855)
Horisme tersata (Denis & Schiffermuller, 1775)
Horisme vitalbata (Denis & Schiffermuller, 1775)
Hydrelia flammeolaria (Hufnagel, 1767)
Hydrelia sylvata (Denis & Schiffermuller, 1775)
Hydria cervinalis (Scopoli, 1763)
Hydria montivagata (Duponchel, 1830)
Hydria undulata (Linnaeus, 1758)
Hydriomena furcata (Thunberg, 1784)
Hydriomena impluviata (Denis & Schiffermuller, 1775)
Hydriomena ruberata (Freyer, 1831)
Hydriomena sanfilensis (Stauder, 1915)
Hylaea fasciaria (Linnaeus, 1758)
Hypomecis punctinalis (Scopoli, 1763)
Hypomecis roboraria (Denis & Schiffermuller, 1775)
Hypoxystis pluviaria (Fabricius, 1787)
Idaea albitorquata (Pungeler, 1909)
Idaea attenuaria (Rambur, 1833)
Idaea aureolaria (Denis & Schiffermuller, 1775)
Idaea aversata (Linnaeus, 1758)
Idaea belemiata (Milliere, 1868)
Idaea biselata (Hufnagel, 1767)
Idaea calunetaria (Staudinger, 1859)
Idaea camparia (Herrich-Schäffer, 1852)
Idaea carvalhoi Herbulot, 1979
Idaea circuitaria (Hübner, 1819)
Idaea completa (Staudinger, 1892)
Idaea consanguinaria (Lederer, 1853)
Idaea consolidata (Lederer, 1853)
Idaea contiguaria (Hübner, 1799)
Idaea degeneraria (Hübner, 1799)
Idaea determinata (Staudinger, 1876)
Idaea deversaria (Herrich-Schäffer, 1847)
Idaea dilutaria (Hübner, 1799)
Idaea dimidiata (Hufnagel, 1767)
Idaea distinctaria (Boisduval, 1840)
Idaea efflorata Zeller, 1849
Idaea elongaria (Rambur, 1833)
Idaea emarginata (Linnaeus, 1758)
Idaea eugeniata (Dardoin & Milliere, 1870)
Idaea filicata (Hübner, 1799)
Idaea flaveolaria (Hübner, 1809)
Idaea fractilineata (Zeller, 1847)
Idaea fuscovenosa (Goeze, 1781)
Idaea humiliata (Hufnagel, 1767)
Idaea infirmaria (Rambur, 1833)
Idaea inquinata (Scopoli, 1763)
Idaea laevigata (Scopoli, 1763)
Idaea leipnitzi Hausmann, 2004
Idaea litigiosaria (Boisduval, 1840)
Idaea longaria (Herrich-Schäffer, 1852)
Idaea macilentaria (Herrich-Schäffer, 1847)
Idaea mediaria (Hübner, 1819)
Idaea moniliata (Denis & Schiffermuller, 1775)
Idaea muricata (Hufnagel, 1767)
Idaea mutilata (Staudinger, 1876)
Idaea nitidata (Herrich-Schäffer, 1861)
Idaea obliquaria (Turati, 1913)
Idaea obsoletaria (Rambur, 1833)
Idaea ochrata (Scopoli, 1763)
Idaea ostrinaria (Hübner, 1813)
Idaea pallidata (Denis & Schiffermuller, 1775)
Idaea politaria (Hübner, 1799)
Idaea predotaria (Hartig, 1951)
Idaea rainerii Hausmann, 1994
Idaea rhodogrammaria (Pungeler, 1913)
Idaea rubraria (Staudinger, 1901)
Idaea rufaria (Hübner, 1799)
Idaea rusticata (Denis & Schiffermuller, 1775)
Idaea seriata (Schrank, 1802)
Idaea sericeata (Hübner, 1813)
Idaea serpentata (Hufnagel, 1767)
Idaea straminata (Borkhausen, 1794)
Idaea subsericeata (Haworth, 1809)
Idaea sylvestraria (Hübner, 1799)
Idaea trigeminata (Haworth, 1809)
Idaea typicata (Guenee, 1858)
Idaea vesubiata (Milliere, 1873)
Isturgia arenacearia (Denis & Schiffermuller, 1775)
Isturgia assimilaria (Rambur, 1833)
Isturgia famula (Esper, 1787)
Isturgia limbaria (Fabricius, 1775)
Isturgia murinaria (Denis & Schiffermuller, 1775)
Itame messapiaria Sohn-Rethel, 1929
Itame sparsaria (Hübner, 1809)
Jodis lactearia (Linnaeus, 1758)
Jodis putata (Linnaeus, 1758)
Kuchleria menadiara (Thierry-Mieg, 1893)
Lampropteryx suffumata (Denis & Schiffermuller, 1775)
Larentia clavaria (Haworth, 1809)
Larentia malvata (Rambur, 1833)
Ligdia adustata (Denis & Schiffermuller, 1775)
Lithostege duponcheli Prout, 1938
Lithostege farinata (Hufnagel, 1767)
Lithostege griseata (Denis & Schiffermuller, 1775)
Lobophora halterata (Hufnagel, 1767)
Lomaspilis marginata (Linnaeus, 1758)
Lomographa bimaculata (Fabricius, 1775)
Lomographa temerata (Denis & Schiffermuller, 1775)
Lycia alpina (Sulzer, 1776)
Lycia florentina (Stefanelli, 1882)
Lycia graecarius (Staudinger, 1861)
Lycia hirtaria (Clerck, 1759)
Lycia isabellae (Harrison, 1914)
Lycia pomonaria (Hübner, 1790)
Lythria cruentaria (Hufnagel, 1767)
Lythria plumularia (Freyer, 1831)
Lythria purpuraria (Linnaeus, 1758)
Macaria alternata (Denis & Schiffermuller, 1775)
Macaria artesiaria (Denis & Schiffermuller, 1775)
Macaria brunneata (Thunberg, 1784)
Macaria carbonaria (Clerck, 1759)
Macaria fusca (Thunberg, 1792)
Macaria ichnusae Govi & Fiumi, 2005
Macaria liturata (Clerck, 1759)
Macaria notata (Linnaeus, 1758)
Macaria signaria (Hübner, 1809)
Macaria wauaria (Linnaeus, 1758)
Martania taeniata (Stephens, 1831)
Megalycinia serraria (A. Costa, 1882)
Melanthia alaudaria (Freyer, 1846)
Melanthia procellata (Denis & Schiffermuller, 1775)
Menophra abruptaria (Thunberg, 1792)
Menophra harterti (Rothschild, 1912)
Menophra japygiaria (O. Costa, 1849)
Menophra nycthemeraria (Geyer, 1831)
Mesoleuca albicillata (Linnaeus, 1758)
Mesotype didymata (Linnaeus, 1758)
Mesotype parallelolineata (Retzius, 1783)
Mesotype verberata (Scopoli, 1763)
Microloxia herbaria (Hübner, 1813)
Minoa murinata (Scopoli, 1763)
Myinodes interpunctaria (Herrich-Schäffer, 1839)
Nebula achromaria (de La Harpe, 1853)
Nebula ibericata (Staudinger, 1871)
Nebula nebulata (Treitschke, 1828)
Nebula senectaria (Herrich-Schäffer, 1852)
Nothocasis sertata (Hübner, 1817)
Nychiodes amygdalaria (Herrich-Schäffer, 1848)
Nychiodes andalusiaria Staudinger, 1892
Nychiodes obscuraria (de Villers, 1789)
Nychiodes ragusaria Milliere, 1884
Nycterosea obstipata (Fabricius, 1794)
Odezia atrata (Linnaeus, 1758)
Odontopera bidentata (Clerck, 1759)
Onychora agaritharia (Dardoin, 1842)
Operophtera brumata (Linnaeus, 1758)
Operophtera fagata (Scharfenberg, 1805)
Opisthograptis luteolata (Linnaeus, 1758)
Orthonama vittata (Borkhausen, 1794)
Orthostixis cribraria (Hübner, 1799)
Ourapteryx sambucaria (Linnaeus, 1758)
Pachycnemia benesignata (Bellier, 1861)
Pachycnemia hippocastanaria (Hübner, 1799)
Pachycnemia tibiaria (Rambur, 1829)
Paraboarmia viertlii (Bohatsch, 1883)
Paradarisa consonaria (Hübner, 1799)
Parectropis similaria (Hufnagel, 1767)
Pareulype berberata (Denis & Schiffermuller, 1775)
Pasiphila chloerata (Mabille, 1870)
Pasiphila debiliata (Hübner, 1817)
Pasiphila rectangulata (Linnaeus, 1758)
Pelurga comitata (Linnaeus, 1758)
Pennithera firmata (Hübner, 1822)
Pennithera ulicata (Rambur, 1934)
Perconia strigillaria (Hübner, 1787)
Peribatodes ilicaria (Geyer, 1833)
Peribatodes perversaria (Boisduval, 1840)
Peribatodes rhomboidaria (Denis & Schiffermuller, 1775)
Peribatodes secundaria (Denis & Schiffermuller, 1775)
Peribatodes umbraria (Hübner, 1809)
Perizoma affinitata (Stephens, 1831)
Perizoma albulata (Denis & Schiffermuller, 1775)
Perizoma alchemillata (Linnaeus, 1758)
Perizoma barrassoi Zahm, Cieslak & Hausmann, 2005
Perizoma bifaciata (Haworth, 1809)
Perizoma blandiata (Denis & Schiffermuller, 1775)
Perizoma flavofasciata (Thunberg, 1792)
Perizoma hydrata (Treitschke, 1829)
Perizoma incultaria (Herrich-Schäffer, 1848)
Perizoma lugdunaria (Herrich-Schäffer, 1855)
Perizoma minorata (Treitschke, 1828)
Perizoma obsoletata (Herrich-Schäffer, 1838)
Petrophora binaevata (Mabille, 1869)
Petrophora chlorosata (Scopoli, 1763)
Petrophora convergata (de Villers, 1789)
Petrophora narbonea (Linnaeus, 1767)
Phaiogramma etruscaria (Zeller, 1849)
Phaiogramma faustinata (Milliere, 1868)
Phibalapteryx virgata (Hufnagel, 1767)
Phigalia pilosaria (Denis & Schiffermuller, 1775)
Philereme transversata (Hufnagel, 1767)
Philereme vetulata (Denis & Schiffermuller, 1775)
Plagodis dolabraria (Linnaeus, 1767)
Plagodis pulveraria (Linnaeus, 1758)
Plemyria rubiginata (Denis & Schiffermuller, 1775)
Protorhoe unicata (Guenee, 1858)
Pseudopanthera macularia (Linnaeus, 1758)
Pseudoterpna coronillaria (Hübner, 1817)
Pseudoterpna corsicaria (Rambur, 1833)
Pseudoterpna pruinata (Hufnagel, 1767)
Psodos quadrifaria (Sulzer, 1776)
Pterapherapteryx sexalata (Retzius, 1783)
Pungeleria capreolaria (Denis & Schiffermuller, 1775)
Rheumaptera hastata (Linnaeus, 1758)
Rhodometra sacraria (Linnaeus, 1767)
Rhodostrophia calabra (Petagna, 1786)
Rhodostrophia pudorata (Fabricius, 1794)
Rhodostrophia vibicaria (Clerck, 1759)
Rhoptria asperaria (Hübner, 1817)
Sardocyrnia bastelicaria (Bellier, 1862)
Schistostege decussata (Denis & Schiffermuller, 1775)
Sciadia dolomitica Huemer & Hausmann, 2009
Sciadia tenebraria (Esper, 1806)
Scopula alba Hausmann, 1993
Scopula asellaria (Herrich-Schäffer, 1847)
Scopula beckeraria (Lederer, 1853)
Scopula confinaria (Herrich-Schäffer, 1847)
Scopula decolor (Staudinger, 1898)
Scopula emutaria (Hübner, 1809)
Scopula floslactata (Haworth, 1809)
Scopula imitaria (Hübner, 1799)
Scopula immutata (Linnaeus, 1758)
Scopula incanata (Linnaeus, 1758)
Scopula marginepunctata (Goeze, 1781)
Scopula minorata (Boisduval, 1833)
Scopula subpunctaria (Herrich-Schäffer, 1847)
Scopula ternata Schrank, 1802
Scopula caricaria (Reutti, 1853)
Scopula corrivalaria (Kretschmar, 1862)
Scopula decorata (Denis & Schiffermuller, 1775)
Scopula honestata (Mabille, 1869)
Scopula immorata (Linnaeus, 1758)
Scopula nemoraria (Hübner, 1799)
Scopula nigropunctata (Hufnagel, 1767)
Scopula ornata (Scopoli, 1763)
Scopula rubiginata (Hufnagel, 1767)
Scopula submutata (Treitschke, 1828)
Scopula tessellaria (Boisduval, 1840)
Scopula turbulentaria (Staudinger, 1870)
Scopula umbelaria (Hübner, 1813)
Scopula vigilata (Sohn-Rethel, 1929)
Scopula virgulata (Denis & Schiffermuller, 1775)
Scotopteryx angularia (de Villers, 1789)
Scotopteryx bipunctaria (Denis & Schiffermuller, 1775)
Scotopteryx chenopodiata (Linnaeus, 1758)
Scotopteryx coarctaria (Denis & Schiffermuller, 1775)
Scotopteryx luridata (Hufnagel, 1767)
Scotopteryx moeniata (Scopoli, 1763)
Scotopteryx mucronata (Scopoli, 1763)
Scotopteryx obvallaria (Mabille, 1867)
Scotopteryx proximaria (Rambur, 1833)
Scotopteryx vicinaria (Duponchel, 1830)
Selenia dentaria (Fabricius, 1775)
Selenia lunularia (Hübner, 1788)
Selenia tetralunaria (Hufnagel, 1767)
Selidosema ambustaria (Geyer, 1831)
Selidosema brunnearia (de Villers, 1789)
Selidosema erebaria Oberthur, 1883
Selidosema parenzani Hausmann, 1993
Selidosema plumaria (Denis & Schiffermuller, 1775)
Selidosema taeniolaria (Hübner, 1813)
Siona lineata (Scopoli, 1763)
Solitanea mariae (Stauder, 1921)
Spargania luctuata (Denis & Schiffermuller, 1775)
Stegania cararia (Hübner, 1790)
Stegania trimaculata (de Villers, 1789)
Synopsia sociaria (Hübner, 1799)
Tephronia codetaria (Oberthur, 1881)
Tephronia oranaria Staudinger, 1892
Tephronia sepiaria (Hufnagel, 1767)
Tephronia sicula (Wehrli, 1933)
Thalera fimbrialis (Scopoli, 1763)
Thera britannica (Turner, 1925)
Thera cembrae (Kitt, 1912)
Thera cognata (Thunberg, 1792)
Thera cupressata (Geyer, 1831)
Thera juniperata (Linnaeus, 1758)
Thera obeliscata (Hübner, 1787)
Thera variata (Denis & Schiffermuller, 1775)
Thera vetustata (Denis & Schiffermuller, 1775)
Theria primaria (Haworth, 1809)
Theria rupicapraria (Denis & Schiffermuller, 1775)
Thetidia sardinica (Schawerda, 1934)
Thetidia smaragdaria (Fabricius, 1787)
Timandra comae Schmidt, 1931
Trichopteryx carpinata (Borkhausen, 1794)
Trichopteryx polycommata (Denis & Schiffermuller, 1775)
Triphosa dubitata (Linnaeus, 1758)
Triphosa sabaudiata (Duponchel, 1830)
Triphosa tauteli Leraut, 2008
Venusia cambrica Curtis, 1839
Xanthorhoe biriviata (Borkhausen, 1794)
Xanthorhoe decoloraria (Esper, 1806)
Xanthorhoe designata (Hufnagel, 1767)
Xanthorhoe disjunctaria (de La Harpe, 1860)
Xanthorhoe ferrugata (Clerck, 1759)
Xanthorhoe fluctuata (Linnaeus, 1758)
Xanthorhoe incursata (Hübner, 1813)
Xanthorhoe montanata (Denis & Schiffermuller, 1775)
Xanthorhoe oxybiata (Milliere, 1872)
Xanthorhoe quadrifasiata (Clerck, 1759)
Xanthorhoe spadicearia (Denis & Schiffermuller, 1775)
Xanthorhoe vidanoi Parenzan & Hausmann, 1994
Xenochlorodes olympiaria (Herrich-Schäffer, 1852)

Glyphipterigidae
Acrolepia autumnitella Curtis, 1838
Acrolepiopsis assectella (Zeller, 1839)
Acrolepiopsis marcidella (Curtis, 1850)
Acrolepiopsis tauricella (Staudinger, 1870)
Acrolepiopsis vesperella (Zeller, 1850)
Digitivalva arnicella (Heyden, 1863)
Digitivalva reticulella (Hübner, 1796)
Digitivalva granitella (Treitschke, 1833)
Digitivalva occidentella (Klimesch, 1956)
Digitivalva pulicariae (Klimesch, 1956)
Glyphipterix argyroguttella Ragonot, 1885
Glyphipterix bergstraesserella (Fabricius, 1781)
Glyphipterix equitella (Scopoli, 1763)
Glyphipterix forsterella (Fabricius, 1781)
Glyphipterix fuscoviridella (Haworth, 1828)
Glyphipterix gianelliella Ragonot, 1885
Glyphipterix haworthana (Stephens, 1834)
Glyphipterix heptaglyphella Le Marchand, 1925
Glyphipterix simpliciella (Stephens, 1834)
Glyphipterix sulcosa Diakonoff, 1978
Glyphipterix thrasonella (Scopoli, 1763)
Glyphipterix umbilici M. Hering, 1927
Orthotelia sparganella (Thunberg, 1788)

Gracillariidae
Acrocercops brongniardella (Fabricius, 1798)
Aristaea pavoniella (Zeller, 1847)
Aspilapteryx inquinata Triberti, 1985
Aspilapteryx limosella (Duponchel, 1843)
Aspilapteryx tringipennella (Zeller, 1839)
Callisto basistrigella Huemer, Deutsch & Triberti, 2015
Callisto coffeella (Zetterstedt, 1839)
Callisto denticulella (Thunberg, 1794)
Callisto pfaffenzelleri (Frey, 1856)
Caloptilia alchimiella (Scopoli, 1763)
Caloptilia azaleella (Brants, 1913)
Caloptilia coruscans (Walsingham, 1907)
Caloptilia cuculipennella (Hübner, 1796)
Caloptilia elongella (Linnaeus, 1761)
Caloptilia falconipennella (Hübner, 1813)
Caloptilia fidella (Reutti, 1853)
Caloptilia fribergensis (Fritzsche, 1871)
Caloptilia hauderi (Rebel, 1906)
Caloptilia hemidactylella (Denis & Schiffermuller, 1775)
Caloptilia robustella Jackh, 1972
Caloptilia roscipennella (Hübner, 1796)
Caloptilia rufipennella (Hübner, 1796)
Caloptilia semifascia (Haworth, 1828)
Caloptilia stigmatella (Fabricius, 1781)
Calybites magnifica (Stainton, 1867)
Calybites phasianipennella (Hübner, 1813)
Calybites quadrisignella (Zeller, 1839)
Cameraria ohridella Deschka & Dimic, 1986
Cupedia cupediella (Herrich-Schäffer, 1855)
Dextellia dorsilineella (Amsel, 1935)
Dialectica imperialella (Zeller, 1847)
Dialectica scalariella (Zeller, 1850)
Euspilapteryx auroguttella Stephens, 1835
Gracillaria syringella (Fabricius, 1794)
Leucospilapteryx omissella (Stainton, 1848)
Metriochroa latifoliella (Milliere, 1886)
Micrurapteryx kollariella (Zeller, 1839)
Ornixola caudulatella (Zeller, 1839)
Parectopa ononidis (Zeller, 1839)
Parectopa robiniella Clemens, 1863
Parornix acuta Triberti, 1980
Parornix alpicola (Wocke, 1877)
Parornix ampliatella (Stainton, 1850)
Parornix anglicella (Stainton, 1850)
Parornix anguliferella (Zeller, 1847)
Parornix atripalpella Wahlstrom, 1979
Parornix betulae (Stainton, 1854)
Parornix bifurca Triberti, 1998
Parornix carpinella (Frey, 1863)
Parornix devoniella (Stainton, 1850)
Parornix fagivora (Frey, 1861)
Parornix finitimella (Zeller, 1850)
Parornix loricata Triberti, 1998
Parornix mixta (Triberti, 1980)
Parornix petiolella (Frey, 1863)
Parornix scoticella (Stainton, 1850)
Parornix szocsi Gozmany, 1952
Parornix tenella (Rebel, 1919)
Parornix torquillella (Zeller, 1850)
Phyllocnistis citrella Stainton, 1856
Phyllocnistis saligna (Zeller, 1839)
Phyllocnistis unipunctella (Stephens, 1834)
Phyllocnistis vitegenella Clemens, 1859
Phyllocnistis xenia M. Hering, 1936
Phyllonorycter abrasella (Duponchel, 1843)
Phyllonorycter acaciella (Duponchel, 1843)
Phyllonorycter acerifoliella (Zeller, 1839)
Phyllonorycter aemula Triberti, Deschka & Huemer, 1997
Phyllonorycter agilella (Zeller, 1846)
Phyllonorycter alpina (Frey, 1856)
Phyllonorycter anceps Triberti, 2007
Phyllonorycter apparella (Herrich-Schäffer, 1855)
Phyllonorycter baldensis Deschka, 1986
Phyllonorycter belotella (Staudinger, 1859)
Phyllonorycter blancardella (Fabricius, 1781)
Phyllonorycter cavella (Zeller, 1846)
Phyllonorycter cerasicolella (Herrich-Schäffer, 1855)
Phyllonorycter comparella (Duponchel, 1843)
Phyllonorycter connexella (Zeller, 1846)
Phyllonorycter coryli (Nicelli, 1851)
Phyllonorycter corylifoliella (Hübner, 1796)
Phyllonorycter cydoniella (Denis & Schiffermuller, 1775)
Phyllonorycter cytisus (Amsel & Hartig, 1952)
Phyllonorycter delitella (Duponchel, 1843)
Phyllonorycter deschkai Triberti, 2007
Phyllonorycter distentella (Zeller, 1846)
Phyllonorycter dubitella (Herrich-Schäffer, 1855)
Phyllonorycter emberizaepenella (Bouche, 1834)
Phyllonorycter endryella (Mann, 1855)
Phyllonorycter esperella (Goeze, 1783)
Phyllonorycter etnensis A. & Z. Lastuvka, 2006
Phyllonorycter fiumella (Krone, 1910)
Phyllonorycter fraxinella (Zeller, 1846)
Phyllonorycter froelichiella (Zeller, 1839)
Phyllonorycter geniculella (Ragonot, 1874)
Phyllonorycter harrisella (Linnaeus, 1761)
Phyllonorycter heegeriella (Zeller, 1846)
Phyllonorycter helianthemella (Herrich-Schäffer, 1861)
Phyllonorycter hilarella (Zetterstedt, 1839)
Phyllonorycter hostis Triberti, 2007
Phyllonorycter ilicifoliella (Duponchel, 1843)
Phyllonorycter insignitella (Zeller, 1846)
Phyllonorycter issikii (Kumata, 1963)
Phyllonorycter joannisi (Le Marchand, 1936)
Phyllonorycter junoniella (Zeller, 1846)
Phyllonorycter klemannella (Fabricius, 1781)
Phyllonorycter kuhlweiniella (Zeller, 1839)
Phyllonorycter kusdasi Deschka, 1970
Phyllonorycter lantanella (Schrank, 1802)
Phyllonorycter lapadiella (Krone, 1909)
Phyllonorycter lautella (Zeller, 1846)
Phyllonorycter leucographella (Zeller, 1850)
Phyllonorycter maestingella (Muller, 1764)
Phyllonorycter mannii (Zeller, 1846)
Phyllonorycter mespilella (Hübner, 1805)
Phyllonorycter messaniella (Zeller, 1846)
Phyllonorycter millierella (Staudinger, 1871)
Phyllonorycter monspessulanella (Fuchs, 1897)
Phyllonorycter muelleriella (Zeller, 1839)
Phyllonorycter nicellii (Stainton, 1851)
Phyllonorycter nigrescentella (Logan, 1851)
Phyllonorycter oxyacanthae (Frey, 1856)
Phyllonorycter parisiella (Wocke, 1848)
Phyllonorycter pastorella (Zeller, 1846)
Phyllonorycter phyllocytisi (M. Hering, 1936)
Phyllonorycter platani (Staudinger, 1870)
Phyllonorycter populifoliella (Treitschke, 1833)
Phyllonorycter quercifoliella (Zeller, 1839)
Phyllonorycter rajella (Linnaeus, 1758)
Phyllonorycter retamella (Chretien, 1915)
Phyllonorycter robiniella (Clemens, 1859)
Phyllonorycter roboris (Zeller, 1839)
Phyllonorycter sagitella (Bjerkander, 1790)
Phyllonorycter salicicolella (Sircom, 1848)
Phyllonorycter salictella (Zeller, 1846)
Phyllonorycter scabiosella (Douglas, 1853)
Phyllonorycter schreberella (Fabricius, 1781)
Phyllonorycter scitulella (Duponchel, 1843)
Phyllonorycter scopariella (Zeller, 1846)
Phyllonorycter sorbi (Frey, 1855)
Phyllonorycter spinicolella (Zeller, 1846)
Phyllonorycter staintoniella (Nicelli, 1853)
Phyllonorycter stettinensis (Nicelli, 1852)
Phyllonorycter strigulatella (Lienig & Zeller, 1846)
Phyllonorycter suberifoliella (Zeller, 1850)
Phyllonorycter sublautella (Stainton, 1869)
Phyllonorycter tenerella (de Joannis, 1915)
Phyllonorycter trifasciella (Haworth, 1828)
Phyllonorycter triflorella (Peyerimhoff, 1872)
Phyllonorycter tristrigella (Haworth, 1828)
Phyllonorycter ulicicolella (Stainton, 1851)
Phyllonorycter ulmifoliella (Hübner, 1817)
Phyllonorycter viminetorum (Stainton, 1854)
Phyllonorycter vulturella (Deschka, 1968)
Povolnya leucapennella (Stephens, 1835)
Sauterina hofmanniella (Schleich, 1867)
Spulerina simploniella (Fischer von Röslerstamm, 1840)

Heliodinidae
Heliodines roesella (Linnaeus, 1758)

Heliozelidae
Antispila metallella ([Denis & Schiffermüller], 1775)
Antispila oinophylla Van Nieukerken & Wagner, 2012
Antispila ampelopsifoliella Chambers, 1874
Antispila treitschkiella (Fischer von Röslerstamm, 1843)
Heliozela lithargyrellum (Zeller, 1850)
Heliozela sericiella (Haworth, 1828)
Holocacista rivillei (Stainton, 1855)

Hepialidae
Gazoryctra ganna (Hübner, 1808)
Hepialus humuli (Linnaeus, 1758)
Pharmacis aemilianus (Costantini, 1911)
Pharmacis anselminae (Teobaldelli, 1977)
Pharmacis bertrandi (Le Cerf, 1936)
Pharmacis carna (Denis & Schiffermuller, 1775)
Pharmacis claudiae Kristal & Hirneisen, 1994
Pharmacis fusconebulosa (DeGeer, 1778)
Pharmacis lupulina (Linnaeus, 1758)
Phymatopus hecta (Linnaeus, 1758)
Triodia sylvina (Linnaeus, 1761)

Heterogynidae
Heterogynis eremita Zilli, Cianchi, Racheli & Bullini, 1988
Heterogynis penella (Hübner, 1819)

Incurvariidae
Alloclemensia mesospilella (Herrich-Schäffer, 1854)
Crinopteryx familiella Peyerimhoff, 1871
Incurvaria koerneriella (Zeller, 1839)
Incurvaria masculella (Denis & Schiffermuller, 1775)
Incurvaria oehlmanniella (Hübner, 1796)
Incurvaria pectinea Haworth, 1828
Incurvaria ploessli Huemer, 1993
Incurvaria praelatella (Denis & Schiffermuller, 1775)
Incurvaria triglavensis Hauder, 1912
Paraclemensia cyanella (Zeller, 1850)

Lasiocampidae
Cosmotriche lobulina (Denis & Schiffermuller, 1775)
Dendrolimus pini (Linnaeus, 1758)
Eriogaster arbusculae Freyer, 1849
Eriogaster catax (Linnaeus, 1758)
Eriogaster lanestris (Linnaeus, 1758)
Eriogaster rimicola (Denis & Schiffermuller, 1775)
Euthrix potatoria (Linnaeus, 1758)
Gastropacha quercifolia (Linnaeus, 1758)
Gastropacha populifolia (Denis & Schiffermuller, 1775)
Lasiocampa quercus (Linnaeus, 1758)
Lasiocampa trifolii (Denis & Schiffermuller, 1775)
Macrothylacia rubi (Linnaeus, 1758)
Malacosoma castrensis (Linnaeus, 1758)
Malacosoma neustria (Linnaeus, 1758)
Malacosoma alpicola Staudinger, 1870
Malacosoma franconica (Denis & Schiffermuller, 1775)
Odonestis pruni (Linnaeus, 1758)
Pachypasa otus (Drury, 1773)
Phyllodesma ilicifolia (Linnaeus, 1758)
Phyllodesma tremulifolia (Hübner, 1810)
Poecilocampa alpina (Frey & Wullschlegel, 1874)
Poecilocampa populi (Linnaeus, 1758)
Trichiura crataegi (Linnaeus, 1758)

Lecithoceridae
Eurodachtha canigella (Caradja, 1920)
Eurodachtha siculella (Wocke, 1889)
Homaloxestis briantiella (Turati, 1879)
Lecithocera nigrana (Duponchel, 1836)
Odites kollarella (O. G. Costa, 1832)
Odites ternatella (Staudinger, 1859)

Limacodidae
Apoda limacodes (Hufnagel, 1766)
Heterogenea asella (Denis & Schiffermuller, 1775)

Lyonetiidae
Leucoptera calycotomella Amsel, 1939
Leucoptera coronillae (M. Hering, 1933)
Leucoptera genistae (M. Hering, 1933)
Leucoptera heringiella Toll, 1938
Leucoptera laburnella (Stainton, 1851)
Leucoptera lotella (Stainton, 1859)
Leucoptera lustratella (Herrich-Schäffer, 1855)
Leucoptera malifoliella (O. Costa, 1836)
Leucoptera sinuella (Reutti, 1853)
Leucoptera spartifoliella (Hübner, 1813)
Leucoptera zanclaeella (Zeller, 1848)
Lyonetia clerkella (Linnaeus, 1758)
Lyonetia prunifoliella (Hübner, 1796)
Lyonetia pulverulentella Zeller, 1839
Phyllobrostis daphneella Staudinger, 1859
Phyllobrostis eremitella de Joannis, 1912
Phyllobrostis fregenella Hartig, 1941
Phyllobrostis hartmanni Staudinger, 1867

Lypusidae
Lypusa maurella (Denis & Schiffermuller, 1775)
Lypusa tokari Elsner, Liska & Petru, 2008
Pseudatemelia colurnella (Mann, 1867)
Pseudatemelia flavifrontella (Denis & Schiffermuller, 1775)
Pseudatemelia lavandulae (Mann, 1855)
Pseudatemelia pallidella Jackh, 1972
Pseudatemelia subochreella (Doubleday, 1859)
Pseudatemelia synchrozella (Jackh, 1959)
Pseudatemelia elsae Svensson, 1982
Pseudatemelia josephinae (Toll, 1956)

Micropterigidae
Micropterix aglaella (Duponchel, 1838)
Micropterix allionella (Fabricius, 1794)
Micropterix aruncella (Scopoli, 1763)
Micropterix aureatella (Scopoli, 1763)
Micropterix aureoviridella (Hofner, 1898)
Micropterix calthella (Linnaeus, 1761)
Micropterix completella Staudinger, 1871
Micropterix croatica Heath & Kaltenbach, 1984
Micropterix emiliensis Viette, 1950
Micropterix erctella Walsingham, 1919
Micropterix fenestrellensis Heath & Kaltenbach, 1984
Micropterix garganoensis Heath, 1960
Micropterix gaudiella Zeller & Huemer, 2015
Micropterix hartigi Heath, 1981
Micropterix isobasella Staudinger, 1871
Micropterix italica Heath, 1981
Micropterix myrtetella Zeller, 1850
Micropterix osthelderi Heath, 1975
Micropterix paykullella (Fabricius, 1794)
Micropterix rablensis Zeller, 1868
Micropterix renatae M. E. Kurz, M. A. Kurz & Zeller-Lukashort, 1997
Micropterix rothenbachii Frey, 1856
Micropterix schaefferi Heath, 1975
Micropterix sicanella Zeller, 1847
Micropterix trifasciella Heath, 1965
Micropterix trinacriella M. A. Kurz, Zeller-Lukashort & M. E. Kurz, 1997
Micropterix tuscaniensis Heath, 1960
Micropterix uxoria Walsingham, 1919
Micropterix vulturensis Heath, 1981
Micropterix wockei Staudinger, 1870
Micropterix zangheriella Heath, 1963

Millieridae
Millieria dolosalis (Heydenreich, 1851)

Momphidae
Mompha langiella (Hübner, 1796)
Mompha idaei (Zeller, 1839)
Mompha miscella (Denis & Schiffermuller, 1775)
Mompha conturbatella (Hübner, 1819)
Mompha divisella Herrich-Schäffer, 1854
Mompha epilobiella (Denis & Schiffermuller, 1775)
Mompha lacteella (Stephens, 1834)
Mompha ochraceella (Curtis, 1839)
Mompha propinquella (Stainton, 1851)
Mompha sturnipennella (Treitschke, 1833)
Mompha subbistrigella (Haworth, 1828)
Mompha locupletella (Denis & Schiffermuller, 1775)
Mompha raschkiella (Zeller, 1839)

See also
List of butterflies of Italy

External links
Fauna Europaea

Moths02
Italy02
Italy02